Jacob and Samuel Hawken were American gunsmiths and traders who operated from their shop in St. Louis, Missouri from 1825 to 1855. They are famous for designing the "plains rifle" named after them (the Hawken rifle).

History
Born in Hagerstown, Maryland, Jacob (born 1786) and Samuel (born October 26, 1792) were brought up to become gunsmiths. Despite the fact that local folklore sets the establishment of their shop in 1807 the evidence suggests that Jacob worked for the Harpers Ferry Armory from 1808 until at least 1818,  when he moved to Missouri and bought  of land in New Madrid. He also entered into a partnership with a St. Louis, Missouri gunsmith named James Lakenan which lasted until the latter's death on August 25, 1825.

Meanwhile, Samuel had established his own enterprise in Xenia, Ohio; but after the death of his wife and father, he relocated to St. Louis, where he formed a fresh business, separate to that of Lakenan and his older brother. The Hawkens became partners, however, after Lakenan's death.

Their shop, though it excelled in gun-smithing, was also a bastion of old-fashioned craftsmanship; for up until 1848, they repaired and restocked tools as well as firearms and produced brass axes, tomahawks, gun worms and even basket-style hilts for swords.

Jacob Hawken died in 1849 (his burial location is unknown) and Samuel continued with the business on his own. In 1855, he retired and passed the shop to his son William, and William's business partner Tristram Campbell.

Samuel Hawken died on May 8, 1884, at the age of 92, in St. Louis. He was buried at Bellefontaine Cemetery.

References

Further reading 
 Museum of the Mountain Man
 The Hawken Rifle: Its Place in History, by Charles E Hanson Jr.

Hawken
Hawken
People from St. Louis
People from Harpers Ferry, West Virginia